Oleh Yuriyovych Skrypka (born 24 May 1964) is a Ukrainian musician, vocalist, composer, and leader of the group Vopli Vidoplyasova.

Biography 
Oleh Skrypka was born in Sovetabad (now Ghafurov, Tajikistan). His mother Anna Alekseevna, a teacher, came from a small village in the Kursk region of Russia. In 1972, the Skrypka family moved to the Murmansk region of Russia, due to Anna not liking the Tajik climate.

In 1987, he graduated from Kyiv Polytechnic Institute, founding the rock group Vopli Vidopliassova (VV) that same year with Yuri Zdorenko and Alexander Pipa of the heavy metal band SOS and mutual friend Serhiy Sakhno. In 1987, VV became a member of the Kyiv rock club, won the first prize at the Kyiv rock festival "Rock-parade", released their hit "Танцi" ("dancing", or "dances").

In 1990, the group took a tour of France and Switzerland, during which time one of France's largest newspapers, Le Monde, published material about VV. From 1991 to 1996, Oleh Skrypka, together with his group, lived in France, and toured the country. In 1993, Zdorenko and Sakhno left and Skripka replaced them with French musicians. Sakhno would return in 1997.

In 1996, he returned to Kyiv and since then has been playing many concerts in Ukraine and abroad. Before 2014, he regularly visited Moscow. In 2000, VV performed in Riga, London, gave a concert in the Moscow Palace of Youth, after that - a tour around the cities of Siberia.

In January 2002 the group toured Israel and Portugal, and in February of the same year gave several concerts in New York. In 2003, they performed in Toronto.

In 2004, Skrypka was one of the organizers of the festival Krayina Mriy, the festival began its history 14 years after the song and ten years after the album "VV" with the same name. Under the auspices of "Krayina Mriy" Oleg Skrypka also involved in publishing and versatile educational activities. Skrypka is the founder of another festival of modern Ukrainian rock music - "Rock Sich". The main purpose of the festival - to support the national rock culture. This capital and the only festival where both the three stages heard Ukrainian rock music. (In 2010, "Rock Sich" has acquired the status of an environmental festival. And from 2013 the festival gained international status, becoming a Swedish-Ukrainian).

In 2007, Skrypka won the second place in the project "Dances with the stars 2". In 2009, a group of activists attempted to nominate Skrypka as a candidate for President of Ukraine, but he refused the nomination.

He speaks fluently Ukrainian, Russian, English and French. His first language was Russian - his first exposure to Ukrainian came in 1974, when he went on a family holiday to Giltsi. He did not become fluent in Ukrainian until 1994.

Controversy 
In 2014, Skrypka stated in an interview with Rossiiskaya gazeta that he and Vopli Vidopliassova would no longer perform in Russia. Later that year, he pulled out of a concert in London that also featured popular Russian singer Valeriya, stating that he would not perform in Russia or alongside Russians "as long as Russia and Ukraine are at war".

In 2016, Skrypka and numerous other Ukrainian entertainers lobbied President Petro Poroshenko to ban broadcasting of Russian film and music in the country, as well as banning the import of Russian film and music.

Discography 
 2001 — Inkoly (Інколи)
 2004 — Vidrada (Відрада)
 2009 — Serce u mene vrazilve (Серце у Мене Вразливе)
 2010 — Shchedryk (Щедрик)
 2011 — Jorjina (Жоржина)
 2011 — Humanisty (feat. Les Poderv'yansky) (Гуманісти)
 2016 — Ukrayina (Україна) (Nokturnal Mortum cover)

Filmography 
 2001 —  Evenings on a khutor Near Dikanka as  blacksmith Vakula (Вечера на хуторе близ Диканьки)
 2002 —  Cinderella as  Troubadour (Золушка)
 2006 —  Terkel in Trouble (voice in Ukrainian) 
 2006 —  Carlson, who lives on the roof as  Carlson (voice) 
 2007 —  Milkmaid of Hatsapetivka as  cameo (Доярка из Хацапетовки)
 2008 —  Radio Day as  cameo (День Радио)
 2008 —  Alice Birthday as  Professor Seleznev (День народження Аліси)
 2012 —  After School as  Ketchup (После школы)
 2013 —  My Мermaid, Мy Lorelyay as  policeman (Моя Русалка, моя Лореляй)

References

External links

 Krayina Mriy: Art Space Oleg Skrypka
 «Vopli Vidopliassova» at site Krayina Mriy
 Official Facebook page
 Проектуючи Україну мрій / Український тиждень. No. 15(128) 16–22.04.2010. С. 52–55.
 Олег Скрипка: "Головне - знайти контакт" / Український тиждень. № 1(1) 2.11.2007

20th-century Ukrainian male singers
Living people
1964 births
People from Ghafurov
Recipients of the title of Merited Artist of Ukraine
Knights of the Ordre national du Mérite
Kyiv Polytechnic Institute alumni
People of the Euromaidan
Multi-instrumentalists
Anti-Russian sentiment
Russian emigrants to Ukraine
People from Murmansk
21st-century Ukrainian male singers